Catherine Bell may refer to:
 Catherine Bell (religious studies scholar) (1953–2008), American scholar of religious studies
 Catherine Bell (actress) (born 1968), American actress
 Catherine J. Bell (born 1954), Canadian trade unionist and politician
Catherine Bell (British Civil Servant) in 2012 New Year Honours

See also
Katherine Bell (disambiguation)
Katy Bell (disambiguation)
Kate Bell (disambiguation)
Kristen Bell (born 1980), American actress